Carnacki the Ghost-Finder is a collection of occult detective short stories by English writer William Hope Hodgson, featuring the titular protagonist. It was first published in 1913 by the English publisher Eveleigh Nash. In 1947, a new edition of 3,050 copies was published  by Mycroft & Moran and included three additional stories (the last three listed below). In 1951 Ellery Queen covered the Mycroft & Moran version as No. 53 in Queen's Quorum: A History of the Detective-Crime Short Story As Revealed by the 100 Most Important Books Published in this Field Since 1845. 

For several decades subsequent to the Mycroft and Moran edition, Carnacki collections routinely if not always contained all nine stories. Project Gutenberg Ebook #10832 (2004) contains only the first six stories, however, and arranges them in sequence of their 1910 and 1912 magazine publication. Some other publications follow Project Gutenberg, perhaps using its text.

Contents

Carnacki the Ghost-Finder contains the following tales:

 "The Gateway of the Monster", the first story published, January 1910
 "The House Among the Laurels"
 "The Whistling Room"
 "The Horse of the Invisible"
 "The Searcher of the End House"
 "The Thing Invisible"
 "The Hog"
 "The Haunted Jarvee"
 "The Find"

References

Further reading

External links

 
 
 

1947 short story collections
Mystery short story collections
Horror short story collections
Short story collections by William Hope Hodgson
Occult detective fiction